Lonsdale is an English surname which has its origins in the description of the valley of the River Lune in Cumbria and Lancashire. Notable people with the surname include:

Angela Lonsdale (born 1970), English actress
Anne Lonsdale (born 1941), British sinologist, third President of New Hall, University of Cambridge
Bruce Lonsdale (1949–1982), Canadian politician
Charles Lonsdale (born 1965), British diplomat
Chris Lonsdale (born 1987), Bermudian former cricketer and footballer
Christopher Lonsdale (1886–1952), Canadian founder and first headmaster of Shawnigan Lake School, British Columbia
David Lonsdale (born 1963), English actor
Derrick Lonsdale (born 1924), American pediatrician and researcher
Edmund Lonsdale (1843–1913), Australian politician
Frederick Lonsdale (1881–1954), English dramatist
Gordon Lonsdale, alias of Konon Molody (1922–1970), Soviet spy
Harry Lonsdale (1932–2014), American scientist, businessman, and politician
Horatio Walter Lonsdale (1844–1919), English painter and designer
James Lonsdale (painter) (1777–1839), English portraitist
James Rolston Lonsdale (1865–1921), Northern Irish politician
John Lonsdale (1788–1867), Principal of King's College, London, later Bishop of Lichfield
John Lonsdale, 1st Baron Armaghdale (1850–1924), Northern Irish businessman and politician
Dame Kathleen Lonsdale (1903–1971), Irish-born British crystallographer
Keiynan Lonsdale (born 1991), Australian actor
Michael Lonsdale (1931–2020), French actor
Neil Lonsdale (1907–1989), New Zealand editorial cartoonist
Richard Lonsdale (1913–1988), British Army officer in the Parachute Regiment in World War II
Roger Lonsdale, British author and academic
Rupert Lonsdale (1905–1999), British submarine commander, prisoner of war and Anglican clergyman
Shawn Lonsdale (1969–2008), American videographer and critic of the Church of Scientology
Tommy Lonsdale (1882–1973), English footballer
William Lonsdale (1794–1871), English geologist and palaeontologist
William Lonsdale (colonist) (1799–1864), supervised the founding of Port Phillip, later named Melbourne, Australia
Willie Lonsdale (born 1986), New Zealand cricketer

References